Jeremiah Azu (born 15 May 2001) is a Welsh sprinter. He competed in the 2022 British Athletics Championships where he won the 100 metres in a wind-assisted time of 9.90 seconds. He has won multiple championships in the junior athletics categories.

Competition record

Personal bests
Outdoor
100 metres – 10.13 (+0.2 m/s, Munich 2022)
100 metres – 9.90 (+2.5 m/s, Manchester 2022)
200 metres – 20.96 (+0.3 m/s, Loughborough 2022)
Indoor
60 metres – 6.56 (Birmingham 2022)
200 metres – 21.25 (Sheffield 2019)

References

External links

Jeremiah Azu on Welsh Athletics.org
Jeremiah Azu on European-Athletics.com

2001 births
Living people
Welsh people
British male sprinters
Welsh male sprinters
Athletes (track and field) at the 2022 Commonwealth Games
European Athletics Championships winners